Morgan Bridge may refer to:

Morgan Bridge (Old Peru, Iowa)
Morgan Covered Bridge in Belvidere, Vermont
Murray Morgan Bridge in Tacoma, Washington
David Morgan Memorial Bridge in Fairmont, West Virginia